John Cochran Thurman (February 9, 1900 – March 5, 1976) was a professional American football player for the Los Angeles Buccaneers during their only season in the National Football League (NFL), in 1926. He grew up in Pasadena, California before attending the University of Pennsylvania. While at Penn, Thurman received All-American honors in 1922.

References

1900 births
1976 deaths
American football tackles
Los Angeles Buccaneers players
Penn Quakers football players
All-American college football players
Players of American football from Pasadena, California